(6S)-6-Fluoroshikimic acid is an antibacterial agent acting on the aromatic biosynthetic pathway. It may be used against Plasmodium falciparum, the causative agent of malaria. The molecule is targeting the enzymes of the shikimate pathway. This metabolic pathway is not present in mammals. The mechanism of action of the molecule is not through the inhibition of chorismate synthase but by the inhibition of 4-aminobenzoic acid synthesis.

The use of the molecule led to resistances in Escherichia coli.

See also 
 Shikimic acid

References 

Antibiotics
Fluorinated carboxylic acids
Cyclitols
Halohydrins
Cyclohexenes